William Demont Evans (March 30, 1899 – August 23, 1986), nicknamed "Happy", was an American outfielder in the Negro leagues from 1924 to 1934.

A native of Louisville, Kentucky, Evans attended Livingstone College, and joined the Chicago American Giants in 1924. During his career, he was known as having one of the strongest throwing arms in baseball. 

The great-great-uncle of Meghan Markle, Evans died in Los Angeles, California in 1986 at age 87.

References

External links
 and Baseball-Reference Black Baseball stats and Seamheads

1899 births
1986 deaths
Cleveland Hornets players
Brooklyn Royal Giants players
Chicago American Giants players
Cincinnati Tigers (baseball) players
Dayton Marcos players
Homestead Grays players
Indianapolis ABCs players
Washington Pilots players
20th-century African-American sportspeople
Baseball outfielders